Through the Broken City is the debut album by Vancouver band Bend Sinister, released on November 8, 2005.

Track listing
Through the Broken City - 4:36
When Your Skin Makes You Crawl - 5:54
Hell or Shelter - 3:53
Fool to Love - 5:17
Preach for the Stars - 5:29
Tough Love - 4:24
Truth or Truth - 5:20
Selling Promises - 4:44
Under the Ground - 6:40

Personnel
Dan Moxon – lead vocals, organ
Jon Bunyan – guitar, keyboards, vocals
Naben Ruthnum – lead guitar
Dave Buck – bass
Kevin Keegan – drums

2005 debut albums
Bend Sinister (band) albums